The following highways are numbered 182:

Canada
Prince Edward Island Route 182

Ireland
 R182 road (Ireland)

Japan
 Japan National Route 182

United States
 Interstate 182
 Alabama State Route 182
 California State Route 182
 Connecticut Route 182
 Connecticut Route 182A
 Florida State Road 182
 Georgia State Route 182
Hawaii Route 182
 Illinois Route 182 (former)
 Iowa Highway 182
 K-182 (Kansas highway)
 Kentucky Route 182
 Louisiana Highway 182
 Maine State Route 182
 Maryland Route 182
 Mississippi Highway 182
 New Jersey Route 182
 New Mexico State Road 182
 New York State Route 182
 North Carolina Highway 182
 Ohio State Route 182
 Oregon Route 182
 Pennsylvania Route 182
 South Carolina Highway 182
 Tennessee State Route 182
 Texas State Highway 182
 Texas State Highway Loop 182
 Farm to Market Road 182 (Texas)
 Utah State Route 182 (former)
 Virginia State Route 182
 Wisconsin Highway 182
Territories
 Puerto Rico Highway 182